Let's Go is the fourteenth studio album by American country folk group Nitty Gritty Dirt Band. This album marks the return of Nitty Gritty to the band name and Jim Ibbotson to the band. This album reached 26 on the US Country charts. Two singles from this album also charted. "Shot Full of Love" reached 19 on the US Country charts. "Dance Little Jean" reached 9 on the US Country charts.

Track listing

Personnel
Jeff Hanna
Jimmie Fadden
John McEuen
Jim Ibbotson
Lead Vocals – Jeff Hanna, Jim Ibbotson
Guitars – Jim Ibbotson, Steve Gibson, Jeff Hanna, George Doering, John McEuen, Fred Tackett, David Loggins, Barry Chance
Bass Guitar – David Hungate, Norbert Putnam, Neil Stubenhaus
Harmonica – Jimmie Fadden
Banjo, Lap Steel Guitar – John McEuen
Mandolin – John McEuen, Jim Ibbotson
Keyboard – Bob Carpenter, Phil Aaberg, Richard Landis, Kyle Lehning
Drums – James Stroud, Rick Shlosser, Ken Buttrey
Drum Machine – Roger Linn
Percussion – Jimmie Fadden, Farrell Morris, Jim Ibbotson, Richard Landis
Background Vocals – Bob Carpenter, Jim Ibbotson, Jeff Hanna
Background vocals on "Shot Full of Love" – Kenny Edwards, Andrew Gold, Allen Graham

Production
Producer – Norbert Putnam & Richard Landis

Chart performance

References

Nitty Gritty Dirt Band albums
1983 albums
Albums produced by Norbert Putnam
Liberty Records albums
Albums produced by Richard Landis